The Ely Springs Dolomite is an Ordovician period geologic formation in the Southwestern United States.

The Dolomite formation is exposed in areas of the northern Mojave Desert in Inyo County, California, southern Nevada including the Ely Springs Range, and southwestern Utah.

Fossils
It preserves fossils dating back to the Ordovician period of the Paleozoic Era.

See also

 List of fossiliferous stratigraphic units in California
 List of fossiliferous stratigraphic units in Nevada
 List of fossiliferous stratigraphic units in Utah

References

Ordovician California
Ordovician geology of Nevada
Ordovician geology of Utah
Dolomite formations
Death Valley National Park
Geology of Inyo County, California
Natural history of the Mojave Desert
Ordovician System of North America
Geologic formations of California
Geologic formations of Nevada
Ordovician southern paleotropical deposits